Tasman station is an at-grade light rail station located in the center median of First Street at its intersection with Tasman Drive, after which the station is named, in San Jose, California. The station is owned by Santa Clara Valley Transportation Authority (VTA) and is served by the Blue Line and the Green Line of the VTA light rail system. This is the northernmost station served by both the Blue and Green lines and serves as one of the primary transfer points between the two lines.

Services

Platform layout

References

External links

Santa Clara Valley Transportation Authority light rail stations
Santa Clara Valley Transportation Authority bus stations
Railway stations in San Jose, California
Railway stations in the United States opened in 1987
1987 establishments in California